Paigaon is a large village in the Chhata constituency of the Mathura district, Uttar Pradesh, India. 

It is connected by road to Kosi Kalan and Shergarh. Chhata railway station is the nearest railway station. According to the 2011 census its population was 9,464.

Culture 
A two-day fair is organized every year in Paigaon. Which is dedicated to Naga Baba, a great saint of Paigaon. Naga Baba was a great devotee of Krishna.

Language  
The native language of Paigaon is Hindi, Braj Bhasha and most of the village people speak this language and use it for communication.

References

Villages in Mathura district